The All Souls' Waiting Room is a 2002 half fiction, half non-fiction, autobiographical novel from Paki S. Wright.

Content
Johnnine Hapgood, the woman who is the hero of the novel, had been born into a family that lived in the milieu of Reichian psychoanalysts in the 1940s in New York City.

During a suicide attempt with alcohol and pills in 1962, she has a Near death experience, leading her to the All Souls' Waiting Room, which is a copy of the city of Vienna, where psychoanalysis had been born, especially Sigmund Freud's counseling room, the Bibliothek (Library at the Hofburg), the Hotel Sacher and so on.

During the experience she is shown a film about her life, and learns things about spiritual development and about reincarnation and the female principle, represented through a person named Xofia. She meets Freud, Wilhelm Reich, and Carl Jung, and is then returned to her apartment.

While the events and persons in the Waiting Room, for example Xofia and The (Akashic) Recorder, are fiction, there are other things and persons, such as Wilhelm Reich and Carl Jung, who are real, and with respect to Reich's UFO sightings during the work with the Cloudbuster, and some other events, it is not easy to tell if the story is fiction or not.

See also
Wilhelm Reich

Further reading
 Wright, Paki S. The All Souls' Waiting Room. 1st Book Library, 2002. 

Books about near-death experiences
Fiction about near-death experiences
American autobiographies
Child sexual abuse in literature
Non-fiction novels
2002 American novels
Novels set in New York City
Novels set in Vienna
Wilhelm Reich